Ree is a 2022 Indian Tamil-language feature film directed by Sundharavadivel and starring Prasanth Srinivasan, Gayatri Rema and Prasath. It was released on 7 October 2022.

Plot 
Reema is a helping tendency girl, who is very keen helping neighbors voluntarily by picking any sound comes out of their home. As a reason she is seen as a meddling person. Due to this nature, Reema happens to be a murder suspect for voluntarily connected to husband-wife quarrel at next door, where wife is murdered at the hands of her husband. Reema's attitude towards neighbors is not changed even after this long big incident.

In such situation - Reema with her psychiatrist husband Mugil relocates to a new house at the outskirts of the city. To her surprise, a strange and weird noise emanates from the next door of this new house too. At first Reema thinks the house is a haunted house, and she asks Mugil if they can sell their new house and go somewhere else. Later she finds out that next door is not a haunted house, but a heart surgeon Sagul, resides in there with his wife Mumtaj and daughter Fatima.

Notwithstanding that weird sound continues to emanate from the next door, for which Reema believes someone other than Sagul's family reside in their house. The more she digs causes more trouble to Reema, like murder attack by the next door mystery man. Reema with her police brother goes to fight with Sagul's family. They argue as there is no one else in their home but themselves, which creates suspicion on Reema's mental stability. Mugil also admits to Sagul that Reema is not mentally stable enough, and Sagul agrees to help Mugil to cure Reema.

Cast
Prasanth Srinivasan as Mugil 
Gayatri Rema as Reema
Prasath as Sagul
Sangeetha Paul as Mumtaj
Baby Oviya as Fatima
Sundharavadivel as Johnson

Production
Gayatri Rema and Prashanth Srinivasan were cast in the lead roles.

Soundtrack 
Ree has two songs composed by music director Hariji, who composed for TV serials like 'Vamsam', 'Selvi', 'Vani Rani' and 'Solla Marantha Kathai'

Reception
The film was released in theatres on 7 October 2022 across Tamil Nadu and gained a mediocre review. The Deccan Chronicle daily gave 2.75 out of 5 with a comment "had there been a bigger star cast, the potential script like Ree, may have had a greater impact".

References

External links

2022 films
2020s Tamil-language films